Deaf Records was a British record sublabel of Peaceville Records, located in Dewsbury and focused on heavy metal music.

Bands
 Accidental Suicide
 Agathocles
 At the Gates
 Banished
 Drudge
 Impaler
 Isengard
 Morta Skuld
 Pitchshifter
 Prophecy of Doom
 Therion
 Vital Remains

References

External links
 Peaceville Records
 

British record labels
Heavy metal record labels